The LG G Pad 7.0 (also known as LG G Tab 7.0) is a 7.0-inch Android-based tablet computer produced and marketed by LG Electronics. It belongs to the LG G series, and was announced on 13 May 2014 along with the G Pad 8.0, and G Pad 10.1. This is one of LG's new tablet size variants aimed to compete directly with the Samsung Galaxy Tab 4 series.

History 
The G Pad 7.0 was first announced on 13 May 2014. It was officially unveiled at the MedPI tradeshow in Monaco. It was officially released in July 2014.

Features
The G Pad 7.0 is released with Android 4.4.2 Kitkat. LG has customized the interface with its Optimus UI software. As well as apps from Google, including Google Play, Gmail and YouTube, it has access to LG apps such as QPair, QSlide, KnockOn, and Slide Aside.

The G Pad 7.0 is available in a WiFi-only, 3G & Wi-Fi, and 4G/LTE & WiFi variants. Internal storage is 8 GB (16 GB for v410 LTE),  with a microSDXC card slot for expansion. It has a 7.0-inch IPS LCD screen with a resolution of 1280x800 pixel. It also features a  front camera without flash and  rear-facing camera. It also has the ability to record HD videos.

References

G Pad 7.0
Android (operating system) devices
Tablet computers
Tablet computers introduced in 2014